This article list the results of mixed doubles category in the 2009 All England Super Series.

Seeds
 Nova Widianto and Lilyana Natsir
 Lee Yong-dae and Lee Hyo-jung
 He Hanbin and Yu Yang
 Anthony Clark and Donna Kellogg
 Thomas Laybourn and Kamilla Rytter Juhl
 Joachim Fischer Nielsen and Christinna Pedersen
 Robert Blair and  Imogen Bankier
 Sudket Prapakamol and Saralee Thoungthongkam

Draws

Finals

Top Half

Bottom Half

Sources
Yonex All England Open Super Series 2009 - Mixed doubles

- Mixed Doubles, 2009 All England Super Series